Halfway High School is a high school located in Halfway, Missouri, United States. The school's mascot is the Cardinal.

According to the 200607 School Accountability Report, 90.5% of classes at Halfway High School are taught by "Highly Qualified Teachers."

References

External links
Halfway R-3 School District website

Public high schools in Missouri
Schools in Polk County, Missouri
Public middle schools in Missouri